G4 & Friends is the second album released by X Factor runner-up group, G4. It entered at #6 in the UK charts with first week sales of 97,100. The album includes the band singing with guest stars Cliff Richard, Lesley Garrett and Robin Gibb.

Track listing 

 "Barcelona" (with Lesley Garrett)
 "Yellow"
 "When a Child Is Born"
 "Fever"
 "Miss You Nights" (with Cliff Richard)
 "La Donna è Mobile"
 "Another Day"
 "The Last Song"
 "You're the Voice"
 "First of May" (with Robin Gibb)
 "The Wonder of You"
 "I Vow to Thee, My Country"
 "Beautiful"
 "Remember Me"
 "Au Fond Temple Saint"

Charts

Weekly charts

Year-end charts

References

2005 albums
G4 (group) albums